Dame Donna Langley-Shamshiri  (born 1968 on the Isle of Wight, UK) is a British film executive who is Chairwoman of Universal Pictures. She was profiled in Varietys "Power of Women" issue in 2014.

Career
Langley began her career as a production executive at New Line Cinema. In 2001, she became senior VP of production at Universal Pictures.

In her time at Universal, Langley has overseen such film franchises as Fast & Furious as well as Despicable Me and the Bourne movies. Her work also includes overseeing the global specialty division, Focus Features, as well as Illumination and DreamWorks Animation, the latter being acquired by Universal in 2016.

Throughout her career, she has supported mentorship opportunities for women. Langley helped launch The Hollywood Reporter's Women in Film Mentorship program. She also serves as an ambassador and board member for the nonprofit Vital Voices.

Langley was appointed Dame Commander of the Order of the British Empire (DBE) in the 2020 New Year Honours for services to film and entertainment.

Personal life 
Langley is married with two children, and lives in Los Angeles with her family.

References

External links

 Donna Langley on universalpictures.com
 
 

1968 births
20th-century American businesspeople
20th-century American businesswomen
21st-century American businesspeople
21st-century American businesswomen
American chairpersons of corporations
American film studio executives
American women business executives
British businesspeople
British emigrants to the United States
Dames Commander of the Order of the British Empire
Living people
NBCUniversal people
Universal Pictures